The following is a list of the monastic houses in West Yorkshire, England.

Alphabetic listing

See also
 List of monastic houses in England
 List of monastic houses in Wales
 List of monastic houses in Scotland
 List of monastic houses in Ireland

Notes

References
Citations

Bibliography
 Binns, Alison (1989) Studies in the History of Medieval Religion 1: Dedications of Monastic Houses in England and Wales 1066–1216, Boydell
 Cobbett, William (1868) List of Abbeys, Priories, Nunneries, Hospitals, And Other Religious Foundations in England and Wales and in Ireland, Confiscated, Seized On, or Alienated by the Protestant "Reformation" Sovereigns and Parliaments
 Knowles, David & Hadcock, R. Neville (1971) Medieval Religious Houses England & Wales. Longman
 Morris, Richard (1979) Cathedrals and Abbeys of England and Wales, J. M. Dent & Sons Ltd.
 Thorold, Henry (1986) Collins Guide to Cathedrals, Abbeys and Priories of England and Wales, Collins
 Thorold, Henry (1993) Collins Guide to the Ruined Abbeys of England, Wales and Scotland, Collins
 Wright, Geoffrey N., (2004) Discovering Abbeys and Priories, Shire Publications Ltd.
 English Cathedrals and Abbeys, Illustrated, Odhams Press Ltd.
 Map of Monastic Britain, South Sheet, Ordnance Survey, 2nd edition, 1954

History of West Yorkshire
England in the High Middle Ages
Medieval sites in England
Lists of buildings and structures in West Yorkshire
West Yorkshire
West Yorkshire